The 1852–53 United States House of Representatives elections were held on various dates in various states between August 2, 1852 and November 8, 1853. Each state set its own date for its elections to the House of Representatives before the first session of the 33rd United States Congress convened on December 5, 1853. The size of the House increased to 234 seats following the congressional reapportionment based on the 1850 United States Census.

Democrats increased their House majority while electing national compromise candidate Franklin Pierce, a Northerner favorable to Southern interests, to the Presidency.  Effects of the Compromise of 1850 temporarily had reduced sectional tensions, and both major parties, Democrats and Whigs, unified around the 1852 Presidential campaign, with Whig unity more tenuous.  Two small parties, the Constitutional Unionists and States' Rights parties, collapsed before this election, while the Free Soil Party, opposing slavery in the Western territories, retained four seats. One Independent, Caleb Lyon, was elected from New York.

Election summaries
Following the 1850 Census, the House was reapportioned.  In the initial apportionment bill, the number of seats was unchanged at 233, but later one seat was added to California's delegation, increasing the total apportionment to 234, due to returns from California being determined to be incomplete.

Alabama

Arkansas

California 

Note: From statehood to 1864, California's representatives were elected at-large, with the top two vote-getters winning election from 1849 to 1858; in 1860 when California gained a seat in the House the top three vote-getters were elected.

|-
! rowspan=2 | 
| Edward C. Marshall
|  | Democratic
| 1851
|  | Incumbent retired.New member elected.Democratic hold.
| rowspan=2 nowrap | 

|-
| Joseph W. McCorkle
|  | Democratic
| 1851
|  | Incumbent lost renomination.New member elected.Democratic hold.

|}

Connecticut

Delaware

Florida 

|-
! 
| Edward C. Cabell
|  | Whig
| 1846
|  | Incumbent lost re-election.New member elected.Democratic gain.
| nowrap | 

|}

Georgia

Illinois

Indiana

Iowa

Kentucky

Louisiana

Maine

Maryland

Massachusetts

The elections were held November 8, 1852.  However, many of the districts went to a December 13, 1852 second ballot.

|-
! 
| Zeno Scudder
|  | Whig
| 1851
| Incumbent re-elected on the second ballot.
|  nowrap | 

|-
! 

|-
! 

|-
! 

|-
! 

|-
! 

|-
! 

|-
! 

|-
! 

|-
! 

|-
! 

|}

Michigan

|-
! 
| Ebenezer J. Penniman
|  | Whig
| 1850
|  | Incumbent retired.New member elected.Democratic gain.
| nowrap | 

|-
! 
| Charles E. Stuart
| 
| 1847 1848 1850
|  | Incumbent retired to run for U.S. Senator.New member elected.Democratic hold.
| nowrap | 

|-
! 
| James L. Conger
|  | Whig
| 1850
|  | Incumbent retired.New member elected.Democratic gain.
| nowrap | 

|-
! 
| colspan=3 | None 
|  | New seat.New member elected.Democratic gain.
| nowrap | 

|}

Mississippi

Elections held late, from November 7 to 8, 1853

|-
! data-sort-value=0 | 
| colspan=3 | None (new district)
|  | New member elected.Democratic gain.
| nowrap | 

|-
! 
| Benjamin D. Nabers
|  | Unionist
| 1851
|  | Incumbent lost re-election as a Whig.New member elected.Democratic gain. 
| nowrap | 

|-
! 
| John A. Wilcox
|  | Unionist
| 1851
|  | Incumbent lost re-election as a Whig.New member elected.Democratic gain. 
| nowrap | 

|-
! 
| John D. Freeman
|  | Unionist
| 1851
|  | Incumbent retired.New member elected.Democratic gain. 
| nowrap | 

|-
! 
| Albert G. Brown
|  | Southern Rights
| 1847
|  | Incumbent retired.New member elected.Democratic gain.  
| nowrap |  Wiley P. Harris (Democratic) 100%

|}

Missouri

New Hampshire

New Jersey

New York

North Carolina

Ohio

Pennsylvania

Rhode Island

South Carolina

Tennessee

Elections held late, on August 4, 1853.

|-
! rowspan=2 | 
| Andrew Johnson
|  | Democratic
| 1842
|  |Incumbent retired to run for Governor.Democratic loss.
| rowspan=2 nowrap | 
|-
|  | Whig
| 1849
|  | Incumbent lost re-election.New member elected.Democratic gain.

|-
! 
|  | Democratic
| 1851
| Incumbent re-elected.
| nowrap | 
|-
! 
| colspan=3 | New district
|  | New member elected.Democratic gain.
| nowrap | 

|-
! rowspan=2 | 
| John H. Savage
|  | Democratic
| 1849
|  |Incumbent retired.Democratic loss.
| rowspan=2 nowrap | 
|-
|  | Whig
| 1851
| Incumbent re-elected.

|-
! 
| colspan=3 | New district
|  |New member elected.Whig gain.
| nowrap | 

|-
! rowspan=2 | 
| William H. Polk
|  | IndependentDemocratic
| 1851
|  |Incumbent retired.Independent Democratic loss.
| rowspan=2 nowrap |  George W. Jones (Democratic) 100%

|-
|  | Democratic
| 1842
| Incumbent re-elected.
|-
! 
| Meredith P. Gentry
|  | Whig
| 1845
|  |Incumbent retired.New member elected.Whig hold.
| nowrap | 

|-
! 
| colspan=3 | New district
|  |New member elected.Whig gain.
| nowrap | 

|-
! rowspan=2 | 
| Isham G. Harris
|  | Democratic
| 1849
|  |Incumbent retired.Democratic loss.
| rowspan=2 nowrap | 
|-
|  | Whig
| 1849 
| Incumbent re-elected.

|-
! 
| Frederick P. Stanton
|  | Democratic
| 1845
| Incumbent re-elected.
| nowrap | 

|}

Texas

Vermont

Virginia

Wisconsin

|-
! 
| Charles Durkee
|  | Free Soil
| 1848
|  | Incumbent lost re-election.New member elected.Democratic gain.
|  nowrap | 

|-
! 
| Ben C. Eastman
|  | Democratic
| 1850
| Incumbent re-elected.
|  nowrap | 

|-
! 
| James Duane Doty
|  | Ind. Democratic
| 1848
|  | Incumbent retired.New member elected.Democratic gain.
|  nowrap | 
|}

Non-voting delegates 

|-
! 
| Henry Hastings Sibley
|  | Democratic
| 1848 1849 1849 
|  | Incumbent retired.New delegate elected.Democratic hold.
| nowrap | 

|-
! 
| Richard H. Weightman
|  | Democratic
| 1851
|  | Incumbent retired.New delegate elected in 1853.Democratic hold.
| nowrap | 

|-
! 
| Joseph Lane
|  | Democratic
| 1851
| Incumbent re-elected.
| nowrap | 

|}

See also
 1852 United States elections
 List of United States House of Representatives elections (1824–1854)
 1852 United States presidential election
 1852–53 United States Senate elections
 32nd United States Congress
 33rd United States Congress

Notes

References

Bibliography

External links
 Office of the Historian (Office of Art & Archives, Office of the Clerk, U.S. House of Representatives)